John Rich (1692–1761) was an important director and theatre manager in 18th-century London.  He opened The New Theatre at Lincoln's Inn Fields (1714), which he managed until he opened the Theatre Royal, Covent Garden (1732).  He managed Covent Garden until 1761, putting on ever more lavish productions.  He introduced pantomime to the English stage and played a dancing and mute Harlequin himself from 1717 to 1760 under the stage name of "Lun." Rich's version of the servant character, Arlecchino, moved away from the poor, disheveled, loud, and crude character, to a colorfully-dressed, silent Harlequin, performing fanciful tricks, dances and magic. The British idea of the Harlequin character was heavily inspired by Rich's idea of a silent character. Rich's choice of being a silent character was influenced by his unappealing voice, which he was well aware of.

Biography
Rich's theatre specialized in what contemporaries called "spectacle."  Today we might call them "special effects."  His stagings would endeavour to present actual cannon shots, animals, and multiple illusions of battle. Rich began his work as "Lun" the Harlequin character in 1717, wearing a leotard with diamond-shaped patches, and encouraging the silence that became normal for the pantomime character. By 1728, Rich was synonymous with lavish (and successful) productions. Rich performed multiple roles as the "Harlequin" character type while the Company Manager at Lincoln's Inn Fields, including Harlequin Doctor Faustus. Rich was praised for his movement style, allowing each limb to tell a story in shows, such as in Harlequin Sorcerer where he portrayed the harlequin being hatched from an egg. And according to Soame Jenyns's The Art of Dancing (1729: 28–29), Rich was a fine dancer, noted for his elevation:

That Pindar Rich despises Vulgar Roads,
And soars an Eagle’s height among the Clouds,
Whilst humbler Dancers, fearful how they climb,
But buzz below amidst the flow’ry Thyme:
Now soft and slow he bends the circling Round,
Now rises high upon the spritely Bound,
Now springs aloft, too swift for Mortal sight,
Now falls unhurt from some stupendous Height;
Like Proteus, in a thousand Forms is seen,
Sometimes a God, sometimes an Harlequin.

Lewis Theobald was working for Rich on writing pantomimes.  When Alexander Pope wrote the first version of The Dunciad, and even more in the second and third editions, Rich appears as a prime symptom of the disease of the age and debasement of taste.  In his Dunciad Variorum of 1732, he makes John Rich the angel of the goddess Dulness:

Immortal Rich! how calm he sits at ease
Mid snows of paper, and fierce hail of pease;
And proud his mistress' orders to perform,
Rides in the whirlwind, and directs the storm." (III l. 257–260)

The battle between Cibber's Drury Lane and Rich's Lincoln's Inn Fields Pope summarizes as,

"Here shouts all Drury, there all Lincoln's-Inn;
Contending Theatres our (Dulness's) empire raise,
Alike their labours, and alike their praise."

Yet, at the same time, 1728 was the year that Rich produced John Gay's Beggar's Opera. The play ran so successfully, with 62 performances, that it was famously said the play "made Gay rich and Rich gay." John Gay was a long-time friend of Pope's and a frequent collaborator of his. Rich's success with Beggar's Opera allowed him to open his own theatre, and in December 1732 he opened the Theatre Royal Covent Garden. This was the first of three theatres on the site, now known as the Royal Opera House. Rich commissioned some of the great landscape artists of his day to paint the scenery for Covent Garden, including George Lambert. His niece was Mary Bulkley, who trained and performed at Covent Garden Theatre during his lifetime.

Rich received a 75% share in the Lincoln's Inn Fields theatre from his father, Christopher Rich, upon his death in 1714. At that time, the theatre was by no means ready for use, as it was still under construction. By that point, Rich had already begun acting in plays and taking a hand in the theatrical management.  His father had set the reputation and direction of the Lincoln's Inn Theatre during the War of the Theatres in the 1690s, and John Rich continued it.  In particular, John Rich exaggerated the theatricality of the Restoration spectacular by creating a new form of hireling drama designed strictly to generate opulent stagecraft.  After becoming the majority owner of Lincoln's Inn Fields, his control grew as he sought to get the rest of the shares. It was the success of Beggar's Opera that allowed him, in the end, to open the new theatre at Covent Garden. John Rich also opened a Beefsteak Club along with his scenic artist, George Lambert.

Rich's work was heavily criticized by some, with open letters being published, accusing his work of causing decay in the culture and morality of the stage. During his time as producer and director, Rich had multiple battles with his acting companies and rival managers, including Colley Cibber.  In Cibber's Apology, he blames the degradation and skyrocketing costs of play productions on Rich.  The general opinion of satirists was that Cibber was thoroughly as guilty as Rich, and the Cibber children went on to carry forth the habits of their father, just as John Rich carried forth and exaggerated the habits of his.  Cibber's Drury Lane and Rich's Lincoln's Inn (and then Covent Garden) theatres were in competition throughout Rich's lifetime.  Indeed, the two theatres twice put on the same play at the same time, with Romeo and Juliet and King Lear in 1756–57. Rich's company also staged a number of rarely seen Shakespearean plays, among them Cymbeline. Though he may have been portrayed poorly by his rivals, Rich had earned a reputation for being a good manager among other players, for good business practices, as well as supporting actors who had since left the stage.

After Rich's passing, pantomime was criticized as losing the artistry he exhibited with his performances, relying instead more on spectacle and choral numbers. It wasn't until after his death, that many of his rivals, David Garrick included, would recognize his work. Garrick even said his pantomime performances were unmatched in his time.

Notes

References

External links

The Theatre History Encyclopaedia Entry on Rich

1692 births
1761 deaths
British theatre managers and producers